The Christian Democratic Party (in Dutch: Christen-Democratische Partij, CDP) was a Dutch left-wing Christian-democratic political party. The CDP played only a minor role in parliament. It is historically linked to both the Labour Party and the Christian Democratic Appeal.

Party History
Between 1894 and 1901 Andries Staalman was a member of the House of Representatives for the district of Den Helder. He was a member of the main Reformed party, the Anti Revolutionary Party (ARP). He operated on the left of the ARP and he advocated increased government interference in the economy and the extension of suffrage. In 1901 Staalman was re-elected into the House of Representatives on an Anti-Revolutionary Ticket, but he was dissatisfied by the conservative course of the ARP. Staalman therefore sat as an independent Anti-Revolutionary. He was dissatisfied by the conservative composition and program of the cabinet Abraham Kuyper had formed after the elections and did not support it.

Before the elections 1905 Staalman founded his own party the Christian Democratic Party to enter in the elections. He was unable to win a seat. Between 1909 and 1917 Staalman entered in several other elections. In 1917 Staalman was closely defeated by Pieter Oud for the Den Helder seat. In the 1918 elections, the first election with a system of proportional representation and male universal suffrage the threshold for admission to the House of Representatives was relatively low, one needed more than half of a percentage of the vote to be elected. Consequently, the CDP was elected with only 10,000 votes (that is .8% of vote). Staalman played only a minor role in parliament.

In the 1922 elections the restrictions to enter parliament where highered. The CDP was unable to maintain its seat. The CDP also entered in the 1925 elections without result. The party fell apart, some members returned to the Anti Revolutionary Party while others joined the newly founded Christian Democratic Union together with former members of the Christian Social Party and the League of Christian Socialists.

Ideology & Issues
The CDP was a leftwing christian democratic party. It was a reformist and rejected both class conflict and the privileged position of some classes over others. Unlike the ARP it did not reject cooperation with non-religious parties.

It had a traditional leftwing program, involving the extension of suffrage to all householders, the implementation of mandatory insurance against sickness and invalidity (an early form of the welfare state), progressive taxation and stronger rights for workers.

Representation
This table shows the election results of the CDP in elections to the House of Representatives, the Senate and the States-Provincial, as well as the party's political leadership: the fractievoorzitter, the chair of the parliamentary party and the lijsttrekker, the party's top candidate in the general election, these posts are normally taken by the party's leader.

Provincial & municipal government
The party held several seats in municipal legislatives and in the North Holland States-Provincial.

References

Protestant political parties
Defunct political parties in the Netherlands
Confessional parties in the Netherlands
Political parties established in 1905
Political parties disestablished in 1926
Defunct Christian political parties
1905 establishments in the Netherlands